Jim Heath (born May 22, 1956) is a former American football and baseball coach. He served as the head football coach at Kalamazoo College in Kalamazoo, Michigan for three seasons, from 1985 to 1987, compiling a record of 3–24.

Head coaching record

Football

References

1956 births
Living people
Kalamazoo Hornets baseball coaches
Kalamazoo Hornets football coaches
Kalamazoo Hornets football players